Malate Catholic School (Paaralang Katoliko ng Malate or MCS) is a private catholic gender-isolated K to 12 school in Malate Metro Manila Philippines established in 1917. It is accredited by PAASCU.

History 

1588
 The Augustinians from Spain established a mission in Malate under the advocacy of Our Lady of Remedies.

1596
 The Augustinian Friars moved the little chapel to the present site of the church today.

1909
 This year, the “Beatas de la Compaña de Jesus” (presently known as the RVM Sisters) taught the children of the locality in the “Escuela Catolica de Malate,” an evidence which was shown in a picture of the Beatas’ presence in the year 1909.
1917

The Redemptorist Fathers who were in-charge of the parish started the formal foundations of the parochial school with Fr. Terence Brown, CSsR, as the first director and Mother Alix (a Belgian sister from St. Theresa's College) as the first principal.

1941
 Japanese forces attacked the country and Malate was devastated. The school closed and the classrooms were converted into hospital wards under the American Red Cross – the Remedios Hospital.

1945
 Year of the American Liberation. The school was ravaged by war. The Columban Fathers were in-charge of the parish. Fr. John Lalor was killed in the hospital premises, while the others were killed in the church with the other martyrs.

1946
 The school re-opened after the repairs under the leadership of Fr. Sheehan.

1957
 The year when the management of the school was turned over to the Columban Sisters, with Sr. Mary Bernardine as the first superior.

1963 – 1983
MCS experienced a lot of progress and growth in student population, and construction of a new building was needed. In 1972, a five-storey building was opened for the girls’ high school which is now the Assumption Building. It was blessed by the late Rufino J. Cardinal Santos, DD, the Archbishop of Manila, on January 22, 1972.

1974
 Fr. James McCarthy directed the school with the Columban Sisters.

1975
 Bishop Leonardo Lagaspi, OP, DD headed the School Board and Sr. Ma. Laetetia was appointed Assistant School Directress.

1977
 MCS became the first National Quiz Bee Champion – History Category.

1978
 MCS became a member of Center for Educational Measurement (CEM) and made use of their varied test materials.

1982
 In April of this year, the school was put under a Board of Trustees headed by Bishop Gaudencio Rosales, DD, Auxiliary Bishop of Manila. Sr. Mary Laetetia was appointed as School Directress.

1983
 MCS passed the PAASCU preliminary accreditation.
1985
 A three-storey building, named after San Lorenzo Ruiz was built in the Boys’ campus.

1986
 The school purchased a residential house and lot adjacent to the Boys’ campus. This house was used as a typing room and medical clinic for the boys. This was later renovated to become the RVM Sisters’ convent in 1990.

1987
 MCS had the second formal re-visit by PAASCU and was granted a five-year accreditation status.

1988
 The school first participated in the Rotary-sponsored Public Speaking contest and won the national level. The school delegate was sent to London and won the international level competition. The school representative to the Manila City Girls’ and Boys’ Week was elected Youth Mayor of the city.

1990
 Management of the school by the Columban Fathers was turned over to the Religious of Virgin Mary (RVM) Congregation with Sr. Ma. Rita Ferraris, RVM as the appointed school directress. On July 16, 1990, a killer quake ravaged Luzon and partly destroyed the old grade school building. This necessitated a construction of a new Our Lady of Remedies building launched through a fund-raising drive dubbed “Piso Mula sa Puso.” Jaime Cardinal L. Sin, Archbishop of Manila, assisted by Bishop Manuel Sobreviñas, his auxiliary and chairman of the MCS Board of Trustees, blessed and laid the corner stone of the building on October 23, 1990.

1991
 Sr. Ma. Clarita R. Balleque, RVM came to replace Sr. Ma. Rita on Dec. 8, 1990. MCS launched its Diamond Jubilee on the same year and preparations for third PAASCU re-survey were underway.

1992
 Monsignor Gabriel Reyes, DD, then the Auxiliary Bishop of Manila launched the Madre Ignacia Movement, Malate chapter on March 1. On the same year, MCS underwent third PAASCU re-survey using for the first time Form B of the analysis and evaluation process. The school was once again granted a five-year accreditation status.

1994
 On July 4, 1994, Jaime Cardinal L. Sin blessed the newly built Our Lady of Remedies building which houses the library, computer and science laboratories, faculty room and classrooms for the girls grade school. Construction of a new Madre Ignacia building in the Boys campus also started. Sr. Clarita encouraged the school community to put up a credit cooperative (which at present is growing in membership and financial capacity).

1995
 Sr. Ma. Rafaela Q. Singzon, RVM replaced Sr. Ma. Clarita having been elected as Superior General of the RVM Congregation. Msgr. Manuel Sobreviñas, chair of the MCS Board of Trustees, blessed the Madre Ignacia building in the Boys campus where the libraries, science and computer laboratories and faculty rooms were located. MCS became a host school of local and foreign delegates in the World Youth Day celebration when Pope John Paul II spearheaded the event.

1997
 This school year MCS ushered a lot of physical improvements: 
Renovation of the AV-Little Theater
Construction of the new Immaculate Conception building
Renovation of the school gymnasium and its dedication in honor of Jaime Cardinal L. Sin
Expansion of the canteen in both Boys and Girls’ campus
Launching of the internet service in the Multimedia Center of the Immaculate Conception building
Construction of the Queen of Peace Ladies Dormitory at the site of the Sisters’ convent
Conversion of the three classrooms in the ground floor of the St. Joseph building in the Boys Campus into a Function room and a social hall.
Computerization of the Finance Office.

1998
 PAASCU conducted its fourth re-survey of the school. MCS again used the Form B and was granted another five-year accredited status.

The Immaculate Conception building was blessed in time for the PAASCU visit. The building houses the chapel, directress office, faculty room, music and art rooms, ballet room, classrooms for the girls high school and the PE hall at the rooftop.
Monsignor Gerardo O. Santos, the Superintendent of MAPSA-South Manila, was the new chairman of the board of trustees.
The school gymnasium was renovated to have more bleachers to accommodate more audience.
2001
Sr. Ma. Alice S. Tan, RVM took over Sr. Ma. Rafaela Q. Singzon, RVM as school Directress. This was a year of great re-structuring of the departments and the integration of the entire school program. The retirement of two principals paved the way to the integration of the Grade School Department (no longer Boys or Girls Grade School department) and the High School Department. The Board of Trustees appointed one principal for the Grade School and Sr. Ma. Alice Tan, the Directress was the concurrent and transitional principal of the High School department.

2002
 A new high school principal was appointed and the integration was more strengthened. Significant developments were undertaken:

Intensification of the Program of Instruction with the creation of the Curriculum Committee
Re-designing of the school curriculum to include special courses in Speech, SRA and Computer and in consonance of the new DepEd Basic Education Curriculum (BEC)
Empowerment of the lay administrators with the adoption of the Minimum Level of Authority strategy in decision-making
Venture into International Organization for Standardization (ISO) standards certification through the training of a pool of IQAs (Internal Quality Auditors) to assess regularly or evaluate services of the school ensuring quality
Refinement and re-writing of the school's mission-vision
Installation of the “cool mist system” in the gym – donated by MCS Alumni Association
Provision of an official office for the Parent-Teachers Advisory Council (PTAC)

2003
 MCS was recognized to having quality management meeting international standards with the ISO 9001-2000 certification awarded by TUV Rheinland Philippines, an external agency. The awarding ceremony was attended by the members of the Board of Trustees, Msgr. Manuel Sobreviñas, former BOT Chair, officers of the MCS Alumni Association, Parents Council and guests from the Department of Education and from the city government. Self-contained class for grades one and two was adopted as well as co-educational classes for the same levels. The school also launched the festivals for fathers, mothers and children in celebration of the fourth World Meeting of Families in Manila. MCS Administrators together with the Internal Quality Auditors went for a trip to Thailand on April 3–6, 2003 to benchmark with the Assumption University. The school applied for membership in International Organizations: Association of Human Resource Practitioners of the Philippines (ASHPPI), World Council for Curriculum and Instruction (WCCI). The Alumni Association of the school revived its annual alumni homecoming, intensified its scholarship program and also launched fund-raising drives for school improvement.

2004
 The fifth PAASCU re-survey was conducted in August. MCS was again granted another five-year accredited status with an interim visit in the area of instruction on the third year. The school adopted a computerized grading system. MCSAA gave tribute and awards of recognition to outstanding graduates/alumni. Sr. Alice has prepared the school community for another significant integration of the high school and grade school departments. The Administrative Council through BOT's approval decided to appoint only one Principal for MCS before the school year ended. Electrical re-wiring was undertaken in the Boys campus buildings for further improvement and safety purposes. Non-Formal Education program and Night High School started through the initiative of the Social Action Center.

2005
 Sr. Ma. Celestine T. Viernes, RVM replaced Sr. Ma. Alice Tan, RVM as Directress. MCS started to have one Principal for the entire school to make the school community closer, strongly united in one shared mission-vision. Groups of administrators and teachers from Japan, Korea and Singapore came to visit MCS. Key administrators of Southville International School, Paranaque visited MCS for a round-table discussion on ISO certification process. The school made use of biometric identification system for attendance of employees.

2006
 The school invested in the air-conditioning system of all classrooms with the approval from the board of trustees. The ballet room in the Immaculate Conception building was converted into a museum where the memorabilia of the school in the past years are exhibited. Continuous service and physical improvements were undertaken:
 Establishment of a research center. Drafting, adoption and implementation of several programs: Wellness, Research, Recruitment and Retention, Management Succession and Supervisory Programs for Principal, Vice Principal / Academic Coordinator, Subject Area Coordinator and Physical Plant Supervisor. Repair, re-opening and use of the elevator in the Assumption building to facilitate classroom monitoring. Transfer of two speech laboratories in the Boys campus to San Lorenzo building. Provision of billboards in both campuses by MCSAA. Official and formal establishment of the Night High School for out-of-school youth with recognition from the Department of Education. Grant of international visit or travel on easy payment scheme was offered to faculty and staff creating a venue for first-hand learning of different cultures and for broader exposure (first trip was to China, Macau and Hong Kong). Visit of the Directress and Principal to King's School in Bangkok, Thailand. Provision of the digital time clock in the gym donated by the PTACI. Putting up of a Yamaha School of Music Extension Center in school for students who wanted to further their talents and skills in the field.

2007
 All sections / classes are named after saints Night High School enrollment increased to over one hundred students. The first batch of fourteen (14) NHS graduates had their graduation on April 11, 2008. The PTAC office was moved to a new place in the ground floor of the Immaculate Conception building. The old, flat sheet-entrance gates of the two campuses were replaced with iron gates bearing the school name and logo. The boys’ campus façade was also given a facelift. The high school speech laboratory was upgraded with elevated seating, new console, video gadgets. Science and Mathematics Coordinators were sent to National Institute of Education (NIE), Singapore for training and benchmarking for 7 days in April 2007. MCS Alumni Association made the repair of the gymnasium roofing as their project for the year. The school participated in Rotary-sponsored Voice of the Youth extemporaneous speaking contest. MCS delegate won on the national level and was sent to compete in London, England, for the international level.

2008
 In preparation for the opening of another school year in 2008, the Boys’ library was renovated and extended up to the third floor of the Madre Ignacia Building to accommodate more students. Ten more computer units were purchased to increase working and research stations with internet connections in the library. The library also adopted a new computerized system of cataloguing and accessing books. The buildings in the Boys’ Campus were repainted and new lighting was installed in the ground floor lobby of the St. Joseph building School administrators, particularly the Administrative Council went for another benchmarking trip to Singapore in May. They visited the National Institute of Education, a part of Nanyang University system, where they experienced the new trend of facilitating learning in the university's “Classrooms of the Future”. They also benchmarked on computer-aided instruction at LEAD (Learning Advantage).
 In October, the Subject Area Coordinators and Student Services Unit Heads also visited NIE, Nanyang University and LEAD to have a first-hand experience of what schools abroad have which could be adopted in MCS.
 An encoding center is set up in the boys’ campus. The school received recognition from CEM for 30 years of partnership. The board of trustees with its chair, Monsignor Gerardo O. Santos, recommended to transfer the Girls Grade School in the Boys campus to make it into the Grade School Campus, and the Boys High to the girls’ campus and change it to High School Campus. This recommendation served well the school financially as it could save on books and facilities (from 4 sets of books or 4speech laboratories to just two (2)).
 This year the faculty and staff of Malate Catholic School had their gala uniform. The first communicants wore their white gala dress on their first communion and will be used starting SY 2009-2010 every first Friday of the month.

2009
 Based on the recommendation given by the Board of Trustees, the high school boys were transferred to the Our Lady of Remedies Building and the grade school girls from grade 3 to grade 6, in turn, to St. Joseph Building. The two campuses, formerly known to be the Girls Campus and the Boys Campus, were then called the High School Campus and the Grade School Campus.
 The following major physical improvements were done:
 The renovation of the Speech Laboratory in the San Lorenzo Building, Grade School Campus. The construction of the Seminar Room at the Immaculate Conception Building which can accommodate 150 participants. The installation of a new bridge at the fifth floor connecting the Assumption Building and the Our Lady of remedies Building. Major repair of all comfort rooms in both campuses. The installation of grill fence and four 350 watt flood-lights in the HS Campus The construction of a new gate and canopy in the GS Campus The provision of cork and white board in all the classrooms Educators from Singapore visited MCS for a round table discussion on the Reading program of the school. Outstanding teachers were given recognition by the school through the “Heart of a Teacher” Award.

2010
 Administrators were sent to New York, USA in May for benchmarking purposes. They visited two Catholic institutions – Immaculate Conception School and The Mary Louis Academy, and were able to dialogue with the school administrators.
 A new principal was appointed.
 The Grade School Academic Coordinator underwent training as a PAASCU accreditor.
 MCS underwent sixth PAASCU resurvey visit on August 31 – September 1 (HS) and September 6 – 7 (GS), and was granted another five-year accreditation status, a mark of the school's commitment to provide quality Catholic education and service through the years. Cake and Bread Making was offered under the Skills Training Program of the Pastoral Ministry of the school in coordination with the City Development of Manila/TESDA. Considering the recommendations given by PAASCU accreditors in their last visit in 2004, the following significant developments were undertaken:
 Close Monitoring of the Protect Instruction Program Intensification of the Faculty Development Program Continuous upgrading of the instruction through close supervision by SAC, AC, and Principal Continuous acquisition of additional print and non-print materials in both libraries to support instruction Provision of more student-centered activities Involvement of faculty and students in Parish activities/organizations Improvement of the salary scheme Continuous improvement of school facilities and service Continuous use of English as medium of instruction in all subjects except in Filipino to improve communication skills of both teachers and students Facilitating English Enhancement Session for Teachers Improvement of BCEP and SSTP to better address the varied needs of students Teachers were encouraged to pursue graduate studies. Some were given scholarship grants by the school. Units/Diploma earned in graduate studies is made as one criterion in the teacher's performance rating.
 The following were taken up during the Strategic Planning:
10% tuition fee increase effective SY 2011 – 2012
Upgrading of the grading system Offering of enrichment classes in English, Science and Math in the High School Department to improve students’ mastery of the required competencies and prepare them for college work. Reactivation of the Homeroom Parents Officers to foster better partnership and cooperation between the parents and the school. Continuous Implementation of the Cost-Cutting Program Tapping/Training of students with potentials for out-of-school competitions Strengthening the Recruitment and Retention Program Syllabi and Course Outlines have been revised. In the High School department, competencies in the syllabi have been aligned with the content standards following the newsecondary education curriculum. Learning plans have been made for UbD implementation in the first and second year levels. Administrators were sent to South Korea in May for another benchmarking venture, visiting a public elementary school.

2011
 Sister Ma. Corazon P. Agoncillo, RVM, has been appointed as the new school directress, replacing Sister Ma. Celestine T. Viernes, RVM. Extra and co-curricular activities were intensified, as well as students’ participation in inter-school competitions. Faculty and Personnel Development Program is at its peak. The school benchmarked at Don Bosco Technical School, Xavier School and Southville International School for the school's plan of venturing into technology integration and adoption of Genyo platform the following school year.

2012
 The school initiated a techno-plan integrating technology in instruction. GS Campus has been newly renovated, housing the latest Genyo Laboratory equipped with internet connection. The school has subscribed to Genyo Management System for grades 5, 6, 7 and second year high school levels. The HS Genyo Laboratory has been constructed. HS Campus renovation started. Faculty Development Program is continuously intensified. Students, faculty, personnel, parents and alumni were greatly involved in the outreach program. Faculty revived the conduct of classroom-based action researches to help improve instruction. K to 12 Program began with the adoption of Grade 1 and Grade 7 curriculum.

2013
 Follow through of the provisions of the Five-Year Institutional Development Programs (2012-2017) integrating the corresponding action plans on the PAASCU Team's Recommendations of September 2010 and the RCAM ES KRAs. Revision of Student Manual / Diary. Revival of Bridging Program in Summer. Provision of LCDs in all classrooms. Acquisition of 50 YoPads for Grade 7 students use in the classroom. Educational and Pleasure trip of administration, teachers, staff and maintenance personnel to Hong Kong and Macau. Repainting of High School Buildings and classrooms. Replacement of main water tank with 2 new tanks in Assumption Building. Grand  Finalist in Eat Bulaga HS Division Pautakan and Pep Squad Competition.

Alma Mater Hymn 
"There's a school by the Church of Malate That we honor with heart sincere; It's our own school and none could be better, To our mem'ry t'will always be dear, For the truths that we learn in Malate Will guide us forever more, Loyal to God and our country When life's long pilgrimage is o'er When the days of our schooling is over, And the battle of life must be won, Our strength will be found in the teaching We learned in Malate while young Undaunted by fears and temptations, Steadfast and virtue our rule "True to my Faith" is our Motto, The bond of Malate Catholic School."

Notable alumni and faculty

National leaders and politicians 
Rep. Ruffy Biazon (GS, HS 1986), former Congressional Representative of the City of Muntinlupa, former 2010 senatorial candidate, and commissioner of the Bureau of Customs, 2011–2013.
Hon. Antonino Calixto (GS, HS), former mayor of Pasay, Metro Manila, Philippines
Hon. Marlon A. Pesebre (GS, HS), former vice mayor of Pasay, Philippines

Celebrities, singers and directors 
Kuh Ledesma (HS 1974), Filipino pop singer, diva and celebrity icon
Maryo J. De Los Reyes (GS), acclaimed and award-winning Filipino film and TV director
Nyoy Volante, Filipino acoustic singer and celebrity
Jenifer D. Rawole, one of top finalists in the singing contest, "Pinoy Pop Super Star," GMA TV Network
Carmela "Faith" Cuneta

Journalist and media personalities 

 Charie Villa, seasoned broadcast journalist, News Head of the ABS-CBN Regional Network Group (RNG). She was the former head of news-gathering and online and mobile group at ABS-CBN News and Current Affairs.
 Arlene Burgos, head of the ABS-CBN News Social Media and Mobile, which handles the social media and mobile accounts of ABS-CBN News; also a lecturer at the Ateneo de Manila University. She was editor in chief of the Inquirer Publication, Inc.'s Bandera tabloid, was a research fellow of the Singapore-based Asia Journalism Fellowship, and took her master's degree in Journalism at the Ateneo through a fellowship under the Asia Center for Journalism-Konrad Adenauer Stiftung.
 Cristina Monzon - Palma, class of 1967. Newscaster and TV News Anchor. She organized the Southeast Asian Foundation for Children and Television (Anak TV, Inc) while she was with ABS-CBN Foundation, Inc. (AFI). She is well known for her work with AFI's Bantay Bata 163. She also heads the network giant's Sagip Kapamilya relief operations. She is also part of the Philippine chapter of the International Social Service, Inc. Board of Trustees as PRO, and one of the directors of the Center for Media Freedom and Responsibility. Her work with numerous social and civic organizations were recognized through numerous awards like: 2002 - Named the Ka Doroy Broadcaster of the Year by the Kapisanan ng mga Broadkaster ng Pilipinas for her work at the radio station DZMM; 2008 – Awarded a Lifetime Achievement Award by the academe-based Gawad TANGLAW; 2010 -  Awarded the fourth Hildegard Award by St. Scholastica College, her alma mater; 2014 – Received the Tandang Sora Award which is bestowed on outstanding women in the country who exemplify the seven virtues of Melchora Aquino: katapatan (honesty), kasipagan (industry), paglilingkod (service), palabra de honor (word of honor), kagandahang loob (kindness), mapagmalasakit (caring), and pagkalinga (protectiveness); Awarded 100 Outstanding Scholasticians by the St' Scholastica's Alumnae Foundation, Inc.

Artists and painters 
Efren Zaragoza (GS, HS), renowned Filipino artist, known for his pioneering artworks and exhibits on print, graphic and woodblocks
Azor Pazcoguin (GS, HS), artist, painter and art owner in Malate, Ermita; student of Araceli Limcaco Dans and founding member of the Guhit Group of Artists

Professors and writers 
Antonio D. Kalaw, Jr. (GS, HS 1969), president, Development Academy of the Philippines, the Philippine government's premier government academic graduate institution for top caliber public managers in government
Prof. Jose Duke S. Bagulaya (GS, HS), professor of English and Comparative Literature, University of the Philippines-Diliman; and contributing columnist for the Philippine Daily Inquirer

Corporate executives 
Olen Juarez-Lim, image consultant, corporate leader and wife of PBA star player and coach Frankie Lim

Notable faculty 
Lorenza Agoncillo, one of the makers of the first Philippine national flag that was unfurled during the declaration of Philippine independence in 1898; faculty teacher of Malate Catholic School for more than 50 years
Mrs. Aurea C. Gonzales (pseudonym: Freda Jayme), former faculty teacher, Malate Catholic School, and author of "Catch Me A Firefly"

See also
Commission on Higher Education (Philippines)
Department of Education (Philippines)
Technical Education and Skills Development Authority

References

External links
 https://archive.today/20140315063151/http://malatecatholicschool.edu.ph/about/history-of-mcs/
 https://www.facebook.com/MalateCatholicSchoolOfficial
 https://sites.google.com/mcsmanila.edu.ph/the-clarionette/

1917 establishments in the Philippines
Educational institutions established in 1917
Education in Malate, Manila
Catholic elementary schools in Manila
Catholic secondary schools in Manila